Sibinda Constituency is an Electoral district in Namibia. It is situated in the Zambezi Region. Its centre is Sibinda which is a settlement 63 kilometres out of Katima Mulilo. The constituency has a population of 11,112 people. In the 2020 Regional Council Elections, there were 6,248 registered voters.

Politics
In 2012, Ignatius Chunga of SWAPO Party became constituency councillor after winning a by-election that was scheduled after the previous councillor Felix Mukupe died in a car accident. Chunga was reelected in the 2015 regional election with 1,924 votes, followed by Luseso Parry Malumbano of the Democratic Turnhalle Alliance (DTA) with 322 votes and Lister Limbo Sabuta of the Rally for Democracy and Progress (RDP) with 314 votes.

The 2020 regional election was won by Micky Mumbali Lukaezi from the Independent Patriots for Change (IPC, an opposition party formed in August 2020). He received 1,693 votes. The sitting councillor, SWAPO's Ignatius Chunga, came second with 1,160 votes.

References

Constituencies of Zambezi Region